James P. Andreotti (March 27, 1938 – May 10, 2022) was an American Canadian football player who played for the Toronto Argonauts and Montreal Alouettes.

Biography

Andreotti was born in Illinois and was a letter winner in college football at Northwestern University, where he was also an All-American, first-team All-Big Ten and Northwestern's Most Valuable Player. He was drafted in the 1960 NFL draft by the Detroit Lions (Round 4, #39).

Andreotti died on May 10, 2022.

References

1938 births
2022 deaths
Montreal Alouettes players
Toronto Argonauts players
Northwestern Wildcats football players
American expatriates in Canada